Cyborg is the second studio album by French hip hop artist Nekfeu. Released on December 2, 2016 by Seine Zoo, the album entered the French Albums Chart at number 3, peaking at number 1.

Cyborg was released without any prior promotion or singles, with Les Inrocks branding it a "surprise album". On its first day of release on Spotify, the album broke the French record for most album streams within 24 hours; within its first two weeks of release (on all platforms), the album was certified platinum in France with over 100,000 sales.

Background

After releasing his debut studio album Feu in June 2015, Nekfeu embarked on the Feu Tour towards the end of the year to further promote his album. In June 2016, one of his groups, S-Crew, released a studio album entitled Destins liés.

On December 1, 2016, during the final concert of the Feu Tour at the AccorHotels Arena in Bercy, Nekfeu announced the release of Cyborg as a "surprise album", having had no promotion or singles released prior to release.

Reception

Critical reception
Cyborg was received with widespread acclaim from music critics. Music Feelings called the album "quite genuine," adding that it is "tied together, coherent and above all quite well produced." Hip-Hop Infos France gave the album a score of 15 out of 20, commenting that Cyborg "brings a breath of fresh air to French rap, which has been going round in circles for too many months."

Raplume gave the album a rave review, stating: "After the huge success and the quality of Feu, Nek's first album, he had to set the bar very high for himself and that is clearly what he did with Cyborg." A reviewer from Culturovore, known simply as "Vincent", also liked the album, saying: "Since [the release of Feu] it has to be said, Nekfeu wasn't for me an honest rapper whose full potential I had yet to determine […] I decided to let myself try [listening to Cyborg] and 60 minutes later, my image of Ken Samaras' work changed a lot." They also commented that "the instrumentals fall in quality on the last three songs but voilà, we definitely have the French rap album of the year."

Rémi Tschanz of Aficia commented that Nekfeu "balances his technique, his multi-syllabic creativity, his figures of speech. We are far from the atmosphere of his first album." VraiRapFrançais heaped further praise on the album, saying: "Technically, it is still as impressive [as Feu], even more so because the context of the lyrics make the alliterations even more beautiful. Lyrically, Nekfeu proves that he is one of the best lyricists at the moment and that is set to last." L'info tout court remarked that the album "stands out for its lack of melodies (except for the Clara Luciani feature on the melancholy "Avant tu riais"), and its cold and metallic atmosphere."

Commercial performance
In its first week, Cyborg was only made available online, selling 18,000 copies via digital download as well as a further 24,000 copies via streaming, coming to a total of 42,000 copies sold in the first week.

Two weeks after release, Cyborg was certified platinum with 106,000 copies sold, including 38,000 physical sales, 22,000 digital sales and 44,000 streams. The album remained top of the iTunes Top Albums chart in France for three consecutive weeks after release.

Track listing

Charts

Weekly charts

Year-end charts

Certifications

Release history

References

2016 albums
Nekfeu albums
French-language albums
Seine Zoo albums
Polydor Records albums